Events from the year 1537 in art.

Works

 Corneille de Lyon – Portrait of Mary of Guise (approximate date)
 Hans Holbein the Younger
 Portrait of Henry VIII
 Portrait of Henry VIII for Palace of Whitehall (approximate date; original destroyed by fire 1698)
 Portrait of Jane Seymour
 Lucas Horenbout – Portrait miniature of Jane Seymour (approximate date)
 Domenico di Pace Beccafumi – Saint Bernard of Siena Preaching

Births
 Philip Galle, Flemish engraver and printmaker (died 1612)
 Giovanni Battista Naldini, Italian painter of a late-Mannerism in Florence (died 1591)
 Germain Pilon, French sculptors of the French Renaissance (died 1590)
1537/1538 - Natale Bonifacio, engraver and producer of woodcuts (died 1592)

Deaths
 Baldassare Peruzzi, Italian architect and painter (born 1481)
 Agostino Marti, Italian painter from Lucca (born 1485)
 Guglielmo da Marsiglia,  Italian painter of stained glass (born 1475)
 Lorenzo di Credi, Italian painter and sculptor (born 1459)
 Vittore Gambello, Italian Renaissance sculptor (born 1460)

References

 
Years of the 16th century in art